The Best of Jean Shepard is a compilation album by the American country artist of the same name. The album was released in September 1963 on Capitol Records. Due to the death of Shepard's husband, Hawkshaw Hawkins, in a plane crash earlier that year, an official studio album was never issued. Instead, Shepard's record label decided to compile her significant hits into one album of material.

Background and content 
The Best of Jean Shepard contained all of Shepard's major hits and significant songs of her career up to that point. It included songs ranging from sessions dating to May 19, 1953 through May 9, 1961. Shepard's early sessions were recorded at the Capitol Recording Studio in Hollywood, California. Her remaining recording sessions took place at the Bradley Film and Recording Studio, located in Nashville, Tennessee. The album consisted of most of Shepard's major hits up until 1963, beginning with her first major hit, "A Dear John Letter" (1953). It also includes her 1955 solo hits, "A Satisfied Mind" and "Beautiful Lies". The album also includes some lesser-known songs such as "I Learned It All from You", "The Other Woman", and "I've Got to Talk to Mary".

Release 
The Best of Jean Shepard was officially released in September 1963 on Capitol Records. Upon its release, the album did not spawn any singles. However, songs that were previously released as singles the following year appear on the album. This includes, "The Root of All Evil (Is a Man)" and "How Long Does It Hurt (When a Heart Breaks)". Allmusic reviewed the record, giving four out of five stars. Music critic Dan Cooper called The Best of Jean Shepard a, "A good compilation of her first wave of hits ("A Dear John Letter", "A Satisfied Mind"), this is also the LP that shows up most often in used record bins."

Track listing 
Side one
"A Satisfied Mind" – (Red Hayes, Jack Rhodes)
"A Dear John Letter" – (Billy Barton, Fuzzy Owen, Lewis Talley)
with Ferlin Husky
"Forgive Me, John" – (Billy Barton, Jean Shepard, Lewis Talley)
with Ferlin Husky
"The Other Woman" – (Beverly Small)
"Two Voices, Two Shadows, Two Faces" – (Kurt Hertha, Ned Miller, Sue Miller)
"The Root of All Evil (Is a Man)" – (Jeri Jones)

Side two
"Beautiful Lies" – (Rhodes)
"How Long Does It Hurt (When a Heart Breaks)" – (Virginia Midgett, D.W. Orinich)
"I've Got to Talk to Mary" – (Jeane Mosher, Lorraine Wilson)
"Don't Fall in Love with a Married Man" – (Red Fortner, Joe Penny)
"Under Suspicion" – (Ira Kosloff, Ben Raleigh)
"I Learned It All from You" – (Tommy Collins)

Personnel 
 Jean Shepard – lead vocals

References 

1963 albums
Jean Shepard albums
Capitol Records albums